Lesbian, gay, bisexual, and transgender (LGBT+) music is music that focuses on the experiences of gender and sexual minorities as a product of the broad gay liberation movement.

LGBT music spans the entire spectrum of popular music. Lyricism and song content typically express the frustration, anxiety, and hope associated with non-normative sexual and gender identities, offering marginalized groups a vital platform for expression. Recently, popular music has "provided an arena where marginalized voices can be heard and sexual identities shaped, challenged, and renegotiated". Mainstream music has begun to reflect acceptance of LGBT and queer musicianship. Some queer icons are openly queer identifying and have made impactful changes in the world for LGBT people. Others are straight allies that have expressed their support for the community.

History 
In the 1890s, New Orleans began testing different prostitution policies which led to brothels and gay musicians like Tony Jackson or Bessie Smith. Jazz was born from many homosexual artists. As it flourished, blues performers like Lucille Bogan and Ma Rainey began singing about their sexual adventures with other women. Soon after jazz took off, Broadway shows and musical audiences began to take shape as well.

Despite progress in LGBT tolerance and acceptance, musicians still remain marginalized in popular music. American composer Leonard Bernstein had many homosexual relations, often with other musicians and composers, despite being in a heterosexual marriage. Many artists like Bernstein, Stephen Sondheim, Jerome Robbins, Dimitri Mitropoulos were subject to hiding their sexual identities from the public. American pianist Liberace was famously closeted and vehemently denied allegations of homosexuality until his death in 1987, suing a Daily Mirror columnist for insinuating his sexuality. While the entertainment industry now more openly discusses the role of gender identity both in the press and within music compositions, there is still reticence for many in the business to advocate for LGBTQ+ acceptance.

in the United States, Broadway continues to provide a platform for gender and sexual minorities, culminating to the production of lauded musicals like Kinky Boots, Hair and The Color Purple.

LGBT+ artists 
 Popular music has always included LGBT artists and increasing social tolerance of the late 20th and early 21st centuries has allowed more such artists to come out publicly. Early examples of this arose with the sexual liberation movement, with artists such as Sylvester, Tom Robinson, Janis Ian, and others.

Many openly LGBT musicians have become successful, such as Elton John, who has the best-selling single in Billboard of the 1990s ("Candle in the Wind 1997"), and Will Young, whose single "Anything is Possible"/"Evergreen" was the best-selling single of the decade in the 2000s. Country singer Ty Herndon came out as gay in 2014, after three number one hits on Billboard Hot Country Songs.

1970s 

In the 1970s, the disco, glam rock, and industrial music cultures offered a multitude of platforms for expression for gender and sexual non-conforming individuals. For the queer community disco was a bridge between all people from all backgrounds through an expression of the body. "Disco Pluralism" led to the genre portraying perspectives from many experiences, thus creating a category of music representative of the intersectionality of a queer person with coexisting parts of their identity; such as race or socioeconomic status.

Despite the wide audience disco was able to pull in the 1970s it was characterized by several subsets of the genre appealing to many different aesthetics people were seeking. "gay disco" was known to be softer and appealed more to strong emotion shown in artists like Barry White, and Donna Summer's music, which contrasted with the aggressive percussion in "straight disco".

Disco remained practically exclusive to underground clubs for a majority of the decade until, in 1977, the movie Saturday Night Fever propelled disco into the mainstream. After the movie's success, disco netted around 4–8 billion dollars and averaged from 20–40 percent of interactions on the billboard (1979).

Though disco's foundation lies in inclusivity after the success of Saturday Night Fever its commercial success led to the genre shifting from predominantly black and queer people to white Americans securing a spot for them in the genre's sphere. The influx of upper-middle class white Americans finding success in disco led to several queer people showing animosity towards the genre, believing its capitalistic success tore disco away from what made it culturally revolutionary.

Disco still remained popular in the queer community even with increased criticism on how it derived its success. Authors like Richard Dyer of The Gay Left were able to publish literature in support of disco that the queer community could rally behind.

1980s 

The 1980s saw increased exposure to LGBT culture, namely genderbending and cross-dressing, in the music industry with artists such as Culture Club, George Michael and Wham!, Frankie Goes to Hollywood, Melissa Etheridge, Pet Shop Boys, Dead or Alive, and Erasure.

There was a large queer community that existed in electronic and dance music during the 80s. These genres of music were often played in underground queer clubs in many cities such as Los Angeles and New York.

Music videos began to allude to LGBT relationships, which included Bronski Beat's "Smalltown Boy", Pet Shop Boys' "Domino Dancing", and Madonna's "Vogue".

Gay icons during this decade included Cyndi Lauper, Loleatta Holloway, Gloria Gaynor, Bob Mould, and Judas Priest frontman Rob Halford.

Disco culture of the 70s and 80s is directly associated with queer musicians. Sexual and gender fluidity had become increasingly visible, leading to artists such as David Bowie, Freddie Mercury, and Prince to exist in unique ways that push the boundaries of gender and sexuality. Bowie's 1979 music video for "Boys Keep Swinging" offers an influential example of androgyny in music. In this video, Bowie wears traditionally masculine attire, depicting himself as exceptionally macho while portraying himself as expressionless. He continues a deadpan tone in the video by monotonously singing about advantages men experience derived from the patriarchy ("you can wear a uniform", "learn to drive and everything", and "Life is a pop of the cherry when you're a boy"). The constant dull tone of the video creates a sense of irony, reinforced by the camera cutting to Bowie in drag which further confuses the viewer on Bowie's gender identity. At the end of the video on three occasions Bowie walks down a runway in drag, at the very end he wipes off bright red lipstick on his arm, representing his discomfort with female identity along with its male counterpart. The ambiguity and fluidity of these artists helped to create a safe space for queer people.

Also popular with the LGBT community was post-disco dance music such as Italo disco, house music, Hi-NRG, and freestyle. During the 1980s this music became more prevalent in the United States and LGBT artists gained prominence. DJ Larry Levan started his DJ career at the gay disco Paradise Garage.

In Argentina, new wave band Virus, led by singer Federico Moura, made references to 1980s gay men culture, such as cruising for sex, male prostitution and underground parties; and Moura displayed a flamboyant, sexualized stage persona that caused a homophobic reaction by much of the Argentine rock culture at the time. In the decade the career of several non-heterosexual women also took off, including Marilina Ross, Sandra Mihanovich and Celeste Carballo. Ross wrote the lesbian anthem "Puerto Pollensa", which was popularized by Mihanovich in 1981–⁠1982. In 1984, Mihanovich recorded a Spanish-language version of "I Am What I Am" titled "Soy lo que soy", which also became a popular gay anthem in Argentina. Mihanovich and Carballo later joined as a pop duo and released the album Somos mucho más que dos in 1988.

1990s 

Music in the 90s offers recent examples of women openly expressing their sexual desires and identity without needing to cipher their lyrics. Generally, the decade is characterized by female artists portraying themselves in a more "crude" manner than their male contemporaries such examples include: Hole, Elastica, Salt n Peppa, and Liz Phair.

Feminist artists in the 90s were able to successfully create and fulfill a significant space for themselves for the first time where they were able to write about their sexuality. In 1993, Elastica released "Stutter", a song where lead singer, Justine Frischmann expresses her frustration with her partner's sexual impotence. The lyric "Is there something you lack when I'm flat on my back? Is it just that I'm much too much for you?" is a testament to the sexual autonomy granted to women in the musical sphere.

The 90s created a space for lesser-known artists to be much more explicit regarding their sexuality, shown in the case of Liz Phair's music that ranges from sexual excitement in "Supernova"'s lyrics ("You fuck me like a volcano and you're everything to me) to being overcome by lust in "Flower" ("Every time I see your face I get all wet between my legs".) Ranging all the way to complete indifference regarding sex in "Chopsticks" (He said he liked to do it backwards I said that's just fine with me that way we can fuck and watch tv.

The emergence of a pro-feminist music scene and the constant perpetuation of patriarchal values in Western society incentivized music critiquing said values, shown in Australian rock band INXS's music video for "Beautiful Girl" in 1993. The video explores pressures on women to align with Western beauty standards. They portray the women as beautiful, but in contradiction to the traditional beauty standard. The women are shown without makeup or following any fashion trend, which is juxtaposed with the lyrics reminiscing a pop song encouraging the continuation of beauty standards for women ("Nicky's in a corner / With a black coat on / Running from a bad home / With some cat inside").

Celeste Carballo and Sandra Mihanovich in the highly controversial image used for the cover art of their album Mujer contra mujer (1990), which is celebrated by the Argentine lesbian community.

In 1990, Argentine singers Sandra Mihanovich and Celeste Carballo (who were also a romantic couple) released their second and final studio album as a pop duo, Mujer contra mujer. The record is celebrated as a landmark in lesbian visibility in Argentina and has become a symbol for the local LGBT community.

An increase in pro-LGBT laws and artists condemning homophobia in their music populated much of the 1990s. Groups such as Placebo, Alcazar, Right Said Fred, Mana , and more joined the ranks of allies and LGBT musicians. Bands such as Pansy Division and Tribe 8 led the queercore offshoot of hardcore punk that helped solidify LGBT arts in the decade. Robby Reverb, a member of gay punk band mOral SeX recorded rock and country music as well, including "Accept It", written by gay poet Drew Blood.

2000s and onward 
The 2000s saw LGBT music branch off into its own genre, and new artists like Lady Gaga, Christina Aguilera, Will Young, Scissor Sisters, The Gossip, RuPaul, Mika, Dario, Adam Lambert, Lauren Jauregui, Sakima, Dawnstar, Years & Years, Neon Trees, Miley Cyrus, and Troye Sivan supported a growing industry, spreading the message of equality and positivity.

Country singer Chely Wright faced death threats and declining record sales after coming out in 2010. She made Wish Me Away, a documentary about her experience and it won several major awards in 2012 including trophies from the Los Angeles Film Festival, the Seattle LGBT Festival and the Tallgrass Film Festival. In 2012, Against Me! singer and guitarist came out as a trans woman and changed her name to Laura Jane Grace. Openly gay artists such as Tegan and Sara gained popularity; the duo produced a pro-tolerance advert jingle for Oreo in 2014.

In recent years there has been an increase in country musicians living out their queer identities publicly. Some may see this as the biggest change in the music industry, due to the fact that country artists in the past have mostly been white, straight men. As of today, some of the top artists are openly queer country musicians. For example, Lil Nas X became a sensation when he released his country rap "Old Town Road" that went viral on the short-form video app TikTok. Since his claim to fame, Lil Nas X has used his platform to elevate gay representation, and has carved out space for himself in the music industry as an unapologetic messiah for today's young, queer generation. This increase in representation in the country music industry has brought other names to the scene. County music now has Trixie Mattel, American drag queen and musician, as well as Orville Peck, South African country musician as breakthrough artists in this music genre that may not have previously accepted them. Alongside these openly queer country musicians, there has also been a larger number of country artists supporting the LGBT community. Artists like Garth Brooks, Carrie Underwood, Tim McGraw, Kacey Musgraves, and Maren Morris to name a few, have all come forward as allies for this community.

In recent years, the political landscape in many countries has changed in respect to queer identities. A driving factor of this shift is queer artists who use their music and platforms to continue to advocate for queer rights. Many successful artists have achieved great success by disrupting gender and sexual norms. Artists such as Prince, David Bowie, Cher, and Madonna have incorporated gender-bending into their music and performances to blur the lines between male and female, gay and straight.

LGBT music is becoming more widespread as more queer artists are releasing music detailing the queer experience. Queer artists are sharing their personal stories about being queer through their music which is helping to create a space in the music industry for queer listeners to identify with.

Social media platforms like YouTube, Tumblr, and Instagram have created new ways for queer artists to share their music. These site allow artist to upload the music on their own without the need of a music label that can sometimes prevent artists from releasing music that details their queer experience. In 2013, a year before releasing his debut EP TRXYE, Troye Sivan released a coming out video on his YouTube channel. This video allowed Sivan to share his identity without risking his budding music career. Since then, Sivan had achieved great success and has established himself as a prominent artist in queer music. For many decades, queer artists have been told that if they come out, their careers will be over. The self-publishing features of social media have allowed queer artists to share their music while also being open about their identities without having to risk their careers.

LGBT+-oriented music 
One of the earliest US top 40 singles to feature a positive depiction of the LGBT community was bisexual rocker Lou Reed's 1972 song "Walk on the Wild Side", which detailed the lives of gay, bi, and trans members of Andy Warhol's social circle. Other hits, such as "Lola" by The Kinks and "Rebel Rebel" by David Bowie also brought attention to non-heteronormative situations in the world of rock. Tom Robinson's 1978 hit "Glad to Be Gay" became a punk anthem as it called out the UK's mistreatment of its gay citizens.

In the past, music videos had been used as a way to depict LGBT relationships, even when the lyrics of the music didn't explicitly discuss them, as in Madonna's music video for her song "Vogue". They have since been used to express artists' sexuality. In 2016, FLETCHER's music video for her song "Wasted Youth" presents herself with a female love interest. In April 2018, Janelle Monáe came out as pansexual with her album Dirty Computer, and released the song "Make Me Feel"; the music video detailing a woman's attraction to two club goers. LGBT relationships have also been depicted in the music videos of straight musicians, further solidifying their positions as queer allies. Carly Rae Jepsen's music video for "Call Me Maybe" features gay male characters.

The lyrics of songs have also been used by LGBT artists as a tool to express their identification. Frank Ocean's 2012 album Channel Orange has romantic songs that use male pronouns when describing his love interest. Hayley Kiyoko, nicknamed "Lesbian Jesus" by her fans, made her sexual orientation clear to the public with the release of her 2015 song "Girls Like Girls". In 2017, YouTuber and singer-songwriter Dodie Clark released her song "I'm Bisexual - A Coming Out Song" to announce to her fan base that she was bi.

Straight and cisgender allies have also produced LGBT-oriented music. Country artist Phil Vassar released the song "Bobbi with an I" in 2009, which uses a humorous narrative to encourage acceptance of transgender individuals. Singer-songwriter Hozier released the song "Take Me to Church", whose music video partially focused on religion-based homophobia. "1-800-273-8255", a song performed by Logic and Alessia Cara, dealt with homophobia and the pain that it results in. Macklemore & Ryan Lewis teamed up with Mary Lambert to make "Same Love", a song about same sex marriage that focused on the message that love conquers all. The music video for Avicii's single "Silhouettes" depicts a person undergoing sex reassignment surgery.

Some artists who were perceived to be straight when they released songs depicting female bisexuality have been criticized by openly LGBT artists for their depiction of bisexual women. Katy Perry's 2008 song "I Kissed a Girl" and Rita Ora's 2018 song "Girls" both explore female same-sex relationships, but have been accused of being "tone-deaf" to the needs of the LGBT community. Perry's song was criticized for its use of queerbaiting. The song has been criticized for suggesting that queerness is an "experimental phase" which is inaccurate for a majority of LGBT people. The music video for "I Kissed a Girl" employs the fetishization of bisexual women through Perry's risqué behaviour throughout the video which leads to the objectification of queer women. Both songs have been reassessed in recent years as Rita Ora and Katy Perry both do not identify as straight. Ora has acknowledged and understood that "people looked at it, because they didn’t know about [her] experience, like [she] was using the culture", and said that the period following the criticism was "pretty dark". Perry has said her portrayal of bisexuality in the song is dated and that because she feels that "we’ve really changed, conversationally, in the past 10 years" and that "Bisexuality wasn't as talked about back then, or any type of fluidity." However, she doesn't believe that the song would have a place in today's pop landscape and has said, "If [she] had to write that song again, [she] probably would make an edit on it", because, "Lyrically, it has a couple of stereotypes in it."

Lady Gaga, who identifies as bisexual, has achieved significant mainstream success and has influenced the music industry by increasing the awareness of queerness in pop music. Gaga's 2011 song "Born This Way" has been called a gay anthem for its message of self-love.  With "Born This Way", Gaga was able to promote inclusivity and self-acceptance by celebrating the queer community. The song has helped many queer people to embrace and celebrate their sexualities. Singer and actor Christian Chavez used his song "Libertad" to make a stance for gay rights and sexual freedom. Troye Sivan's music has been highly acclaimed for its authentic feel of gay millennial music experimenting with chill pop and activism such as "HEAVEN", "Bloom", and "My My My!".

Jess Young brings her pansexuality into her music. Her debut single "Champagne & Caviar" is all about that. The second verse was originally written "the only fire's in her darkness, the way it flickers when she goes down on me", and now it's "he" because her girlfriend at the time liked to be referred to in the male-pronoun, and had been dating a guy when she re-recorded.

OUTMusic Awards 
Since 2001, the American OUTMusic Awards program has functioned as an annual LGBT awards ceremony that mirrors the Grammys. OUTMusic Inc., a 501(c)(3) organization founded in 1990 by Michael Biello & Dan Martin, was re-founded as the LGBT Academy of Recording Arts by Diedra Meredith in 2007. The awards are to recognize some of the LGBT artists who have made significant contributions to the music industry.

See also

 Gay anthem
 Gay skinhead
 LGBT
 LGBT community
 LGBT culture
 LGBT marketing
 LGBT representations in hip hop music
 List of LGBT-related films
 Queercore
 Stop Murder Music

References

External links
 Queer Music History 101 by JD Doyle	
 glbtq.com popular music overview
 glbtq.com classical music overview
 Homoground.com Community of Queer Musicians
 "I'll come back" - LGBT love song by George Prime